LYC, Lyc or variant thereof, may refer to:

 Lycksele Airport, Sweden (IATA code: LYC)
 Lynden Air Cargo, an American cargo airline (ICAO code: LYC)
 Lympstone Commando railway station, British rail station (UK rail station code: LYC)
 Lübecker Yacht-Club, Germany
 Lyc photon (LyC photon), the Lyman continuum photons, a kind of photon emitted from stars
 Lycaste, abbreviated as Lyc in horticultural trade, a genus of orchids
 Lycurgus of Sparta, abbreviated as Lyc in references